Spring Creek Academy is a Dallas-area private school. Located in Plano, Texas, Spring Creek Academy opened in 1996, and currently serves approximately 200 students in grades K-12. It offers all core and academic elective courses required to meet mandated state requirements for graduation.

Notable alumni
 Audrey Lu
 Katelyn Ohashi
 Misha Mitrofanov
 Vivian Le
 Nastia Liukin
 Madison Kocian
 Steven Legendre
 Nikki Washington
 Carly Patterson

External links
Official site

Education in Plano, Texas
Educational institutions established in 1996
Private K-12 schools in Texas
1996 establishments in Texas